Civitate may refer to:

 Poggio Civitate, hill in the commune of Murlo, Siena, Italy 
 San Paolo di Civitate, a town and comune in the province of Foggia in the Apulia region of southeast Italy
 Battle of Civitate, 1053